Macroglossum tenimberi is a moth of the  family Sphingidae. It is known from the Tenimber Islands.

References

Macroglossum
Moths described in 1920